Greenbrier is a city in Robertson County, Tennessee, United States.  The population was 6,433 at the 2010 census, and at  the 2020 census  the population was 6,898.

Geography
According to the United States Census Bureau, the city has a total area of 6.6 square miles (17.2 km2), of which 6.6 square miles is land and 0.04 square mile (0.45%) is water. The city is concentrated along a stretch of U.S. Route 41, southeast of Springfield and northwest of Goodlettsville.

Demographics

2020 census

As of the 2020 United States census, there were 6,898 people, 2,393 households, and 1,807 families residing in the town.

2000 census
As of the census of 2000, there were 4,490 people, 1,837 households, and 1,418 families residing in the city. The population density was 748.3 people per square mile (289.0/km2). There were 1,920 housing units at an average density of 290.9 per square mile (112.3/km2). The racial makeup of the city was 97.43% White, 0.67% African American, 0.22% Native American, 0.38% Asian, 0.49% from other races, and 0.81% from two or more races. Hispanic or Latino of any race were 1.28% of the population.

Of the 1,837 households, 41.5% had children under the age of 18 living with them, 60.7% were married couples living together, 13.0% had a female householder with no husband present, and 22.8% were non-families. 18.9% of all households were made up of individuals, and 6.8% had someone living alone who was 65 years of age or older. The average household size was 2.69 and the average family size was 3.06.

In the city, the population was spread out, with 28.6% under the age of 18, 9.6% from 18 to 24, 33.8% from 25 to 44, 18.7% from 45 to 64, and 9.3% who were 65 years of age or older. The median age was 32 years. For every 100 females, there were 94.7 males. For every 100 females age 18 and over, there were 89.0 males.

The median income for a household in the city was $32,568, and the median income for a family was $48,262. Males had a median income of $34,353 versus $23,523 for females. The per capita income for the city was $17,902. About 2.8% of families and 5.3% of the population were below the poverty line, including 5.4% of those under age 18 and 5.3% of those age 65 or over.

Annual events
Greenbrier is known for its annual Turning of the Pig celebration on July 3. It is a large barbecue festival benefiting the high school band program. This community-wide event provides food, carnival games, live entertainment, local artisans, and family fun.  Hundreds of pounds of pork are cooked on open pits during the festival, and the pulled pork is available for sale beginning on the morning of July 4.

Parks
Louise Martin Memorial Park has an approximately 6/10th of a mile walking/running loop that is paved and another approximately half mile of walking/running trails. Additionally, the park has three baseball fields and a small play area for children. There are several picnic areas and a large open field available for various activities.

Education

Greenbrier High School, Greenbrier Middle School, Greenbrier Elementary School, and Watauga Elementary School are the public schools offered for residents of Greenbrier and surrounding areas (Watauga is in nearby Ridgetop). Greenbrier High, Middle, and Elementary Schools' mascot is the Bobcat, and their colors are green and white. Watauga Elementary School's mascot is the Warrior, depicted as a Native American male, and the school colors are red and gray.

References

External links

Municipal Technical Advisory Service entry for Greenbrier — information on local government, elections, and link to charter

Cities in Robertson County, Tennessee
Cities in Tennessee